Gurinder Singh (born 9 July 1992) is an Indian cricketer. He made his first-class debut for Tripura in the 2016–17 Ranji Trophy on 6 October 2016.

He was the joint-leading wicket-taker for Meghalaya in the 2018–19 Vijay Hazare Trophy, with fourteen dismissals in eight matches. He was the leading wicket-taker for Meghalaya in the 2018–19 Ranji Trophy, with 53 dismissals in eight matches.

References

External links
 

1992 births
Living people
Indian cricketers
Meghalaya cricketers
Punjab, India cricketers
Tripura cricketers
Cricketers from Chandigarh
Chandigarh cricketers